The 1972 UMass Minutemen football team represented the University of Massachusetts Amherst in the 1972 NCAA College Division football season as a member of the Yankee Conference. The team was coached by Dick MacPherson and played its home games at Alumni Stadium in Hadley, Massachusetts. The 1972 season was the first in which Massachusetts was named the "Minutemen," as the university had changed their nickname from the "Redmen" due to changing attitudes regarding the use of Native American-themed mascots in sports. It was also the last season of the NCAA's University and College Division setup, as they would split athletics into three numbered divisions in 1973, with UMass moving into Division II. Massachusetts performed strongly enough in the regular season to earn a spot in the 1972 Boardwalk Bowl, which at the time served as the NCAA College Division East championship game. The team defeated UC Davis by a score of 35–14, and finished the season with a record of 9–2 overall and 5–0 in conference play.

Schedule

References

UMass
UMass Minutemen football seasons
Yankee Conference football champion seasons
UMass Minutemen football